The coat of arms of Aguascalientes is divided into three sections. The section on the top is blue and shows the image of Nuestra Señora de la Asunción in silver. She is held by two cherubim, symbolizing the foundation of the village. To her left is a water fountain being boiled, which represent the main characteristic of the territory, its hot waters. To her right are a gold chain and a set of lips, symbolizing freedom and the creation of Aguascalientes as an independent state after the secession from Zacatecas in 1857.

The lower dexter section is silver and charged with a dam and a bunch of grapes, which refer to the irrigation and agriculture. The lower sinister section consists of a cogwheel and a bee, symbolizing the industry and the working spirit of the people of Aguascalientes, on a golden yellow field.

The text on the blue outline of the shield reads "Bona Terra, Bona Gens, Aqua Clara, Clarum Coelum", which is Latin for "Good land, good people, clear water, clear sky". The crest is a silver helmet, which represents the founder of the village of Aguascalientes, Juan de Montoro.

The coat of arms was the winning design in a 1946 competition organized by the state government.

Seals of country subdivisions
Aguascalientes